B. B. Lal may refer to:
 B. B. Lal (born 1921), Indian archaeologist
 B. B. Lal (politician) (1917–2008), first governor of the state of Sikkim, India